"Y Eres Tan Bella" is a song by Dominican singer Henry Santos . It was released on August 25, 2015, and served as the first single for his third album The Third (2016). The music video was released on October 16, 2015.

Charts

References

2015 songs
2015 singles
Henry Santos songs